= Advanced Theory and Simulations =

Scientific journal on simulations

- Discipline: Numerical modeling approaches in natural science and medicine
- Language: English
- Edited by: Stefan Spiegel

Publication details
- History: 2018–present
- Publisher: Wiley
- Frequency: Monthly
- Impact factor: 3.2 (2025)

Standard abbreviations
- ISO 4: Adv. Theory Simul.

Indexing
- ISSN: 2513-0390 (print); 2513-0390 (web)

Links
- Journal homepage; Online access; Online archive

Advanced Theory and Simulations is a peer-reviewed scientific journal published monthly by Wiley. It covers research on the development and application of theoretical methods, modeling and simulation approaches in natural science and medicine. It was established in 2002 and its editor-in-chief is Stefan Spiegel (Novartis Institutes for Biomedical Research).

== Abstracting and indexing ==
The journal is abstracted and indexed in:

- Current Contents/Physical, Chemical & Earth Sciences
- EBSCO databases
- Ei Compendex
- Inspec
- ProQuest databases
- Science Citation Index Expanded
- Scopus

According to the Journal Citation Reports, the journal has a 2025 impact factor of 3.2.
